Edwin G. Holl (September 26, 1916 – August 9, 2005) was a Republican member of the Pennsylvania State Senate.  He also served in the Pennsylvania House of Representatives.

References

External links
 - official PA Senate profile (archived)

Republican Party Pennsylvania state senators
Republican Party members of the Pennsylvania House of Representatives
1916 births
2005 deaths
20th-century American politicians